FK Zastava Kragujevac is a football club based in Kragujevac, Serbia. They currently compete in the Kragujevac First League, the fifth tier of the national league system.

History
Founded in 1973, the club surprisingly made the semi-finals of the FR Yugoslavia Cup in the competition's inaugural 1992–93 campaign, being eliminated by Partizan (losing 6–0 on aggregate). They also competed in the Second League of FR Yugoslavia for four seasons during the 1990s (1992–1994 and 1996–1998). Afterwards, the club took part in the 2000–01 Second League of FR Yugoslavia, as well as in the opening four rounds of the following campaign, before withdrawing from the league.

Notable players
National team players
  Đorđe Kamber
  Vladimir Božović

References

External links
 Club page at Srbijasport

1973 establishments in Serbia
Association football clubs established in 1973
Football clubs in Serbia
Sport in Kragujevac